Equestrian vaulting, or simply vaulting, is most often described as gymnastics and dance on horseback, which can be practiced both competitively or non-competitively. Vaulting has a history as an equestrian act at circuses, but its origins stretch back at least two-thousand years. It is open to both men and women and is one of ten equestrian disciplines recognized by the International Federation for Equestrian Sports (Fédération Équestre Internationale or FEI). Therapeutic or interactive vaulting is also used as an activity for children and adults who may have balance, attention, gross motor skill or social deficits.

Vaulting's enthusiasts are concentrated in Europe and other parts of the Western world. It is well established in Germany and Switzerland and is growing in other western countries. Vaulting was first introduced in the United States in the 1950s and 60s but was limited only to California and other areas of the west coast. More recently, it is beginning to gain popularity in the United States northeast.

History
It is believed by some that the origins of vaulting could be traced to the ancient Roman games, where acrobats usually displayed their skills on cantering horses. Others, however, believe that vaulting originated in ancient Crete, where bull-leaping was prevalent. In either case, people have been performing acrobatic and dance-like movements on (or over) the backs of moving horses/animals for more than 2,000 years.

Renaissance and Middle Ages history include numerous references to vaulting or similar activities. The present name of the sport/art comes from the French "la voltige," which it acquired during the Renaissance, when it was a form of riding drill and agility exercise for cavalry riders.

Modern vaulting developed in post-war Germany as an initiative to introduce children to equestrian sports.

In 1983, vaulting became one of the disciplines recognized by the FEI. European championships were first held in Ebreichsdorf, Austria in 1984, and the first FEI World Vaulting Championship was held in Bulle, Switzerland in 1986. Vaulting was included in the World Equestrian Games in Stockholm in 1990 and in all subsequent editions of the games. It was demonstrated as an art during the 1984 and 1996 Olympic Games events. It has been included in the Inter-Africa Cup since 2006.

The first World Cup Vaulting competition was held in Leipzig on 29–30 April 2011.

Competition

In competitive vaulting, vaulters compete as individuals, pairs (pas-de-deux) and teams. Beginning vaulters compete in walk while experienced vaulters compete in canter. The vaulting horse moves in a minimum 15-metre diameter circle and is directed by a lunger (or "longeur") who stands in the center. In competitive vaulting, the rider and horse will both be judged on a scale from 1 to 10.

Vaulting competitions consist of compulsory exercises and choreographed freestyle exercises done to music. There are seven compulsory exercises: mount, basic seat, flag, mill, scissors, stand and flank. Each exercise is scored on a scale from 0 to 10. Horses also receive a score and are judged on the quality of their movement as well as their behavior.

Vaulters compete in team, pas-de-deux and individual categories. An individual freestyle (also known as Kür) is a 1-minute program, the pas-de-deux kür is 2 minutes while the team is 4 minutes. They are all choreographed to music. The components of a freestyle vaulting routine may include mounts and dismounts, handstands, kneeling and standing and aerial moves such jumps, leaps and tumbling skills. However, many of these skills are only seen in the highest levels. A typical routine for a child or beginner will more likely contain variations on simple kneels and planks. Teams also carry, lift, or even toss another vaulter in the air. Judging is based on technique, performance, form, difficulty, balance, security, and consideration of the horse; the horse is also scored, taking up 25% of the total score.

Vaulting horses are not saddled but wear a surcingle (or a roller) and a thick back pad. The surcingle has special handles which aid the vaulter in performing certain moves as well as leather loops called "cossack stirrups". The horse wears a bridle and side reins. The lunge line is usually attached to the inside bit ring.

Vaulting horses typically move on the left rein (counterclockwise), but in some competitions the horse canters in the other direction. Two-phase classes of competition also work the horse to the right. While many European clubs do not compete to the right, they still work at home evenly both directions, believing this benefits the horse and the vaulter.

The premier vaulting competitions are the biannual World and Continental Championships and the World Equestrian Games (WEG) held every four years. In many countries, vaulting associations organize and sponsor national, regional and local events every year. In 2011 there were at least 24 countries with such organisations.

Competition movements 

Vaulters perform movements on the back of the horse. Novice and beginning vaulters may perform at the walk or the trot while higher level vaulters perform at the canter. There are compulsory exercises and depending on class the vaulter performs seven or eight of them:

The compulsories are performed in succession in the above order, without pause or dismounts.

Dress code
The International Federation for Equestrian Sports (FEI) regulates dress codes for competitive vaulting. Every 2–3 years, new guidelines are released, which consistently declare that vaulters must wear form-fitting uniforms that do not conceal the line and form of the vaulter's body, as well as not hinder the movement of the vaulter or the safe interaction between the vaulters. For that reason, accessories such as belts, capes or hats are prohibited. Additionally, men's trousers must be secured at the ankle. It is expected that clothing be appropriate for the competition and does not give the effect of nudity. The most common form-fitting uniforms worn by vaulters are unitards.

Non-competitive vaulting

In addition to competition, vaulting is a form of artistry, recreation and entertainment. Vaulters range in age from 7 to 30 years and older, practicing individual and team skills and routines. The youngest athletes begin at the walk gait and progress to trot, and canter, based on strength, height, and ability to mount and performing on the horse.

Vaulting is used on a therapeutic level in some instances. People with disabilities can often benefit from interacting with the horse and team members, and by doing simple movements with the help of "spotters."

Vaulting is often seen on a recreational level, through vaulting "demonstrations," and occasionally in local parades.

See also
 Horse riding stunts

References

External links

Federation Equestre Internationale (FEI)
Equestrian Vaulting USA
Equestrian Vaulting Australia
British Equestrian Vaulting
VaultCanada.org
Vaulting for Malawi
Slovakian Vaulting Federation
Vaulting South Africa
Swiss Vaulting Federation
Dansk Rideforbund Voltigering (Denmark)
(Germany)

Individual sports
FEI-recognized competition
Equestrian sports
Gymnastics
Circus skills
Former Summer Olympic sports
Articles containing video clips